is a New Zealand rugby union player who plays as a prop.

References

New Zealand rugby union players
1988 births
Living people
Rugby union props
Black Rams Tokyo players
New Zealand expatriate sportspeople in Japan
Sunwolves players